Cosimo Piovasco di Rondò or simply Cosimo is the protagonist in the Italian novel The Baron in the Trees (1957, Il Barone Rampante) by Italo Calvino. Cosimo climbs in a tree at the beginning of the novel and will spend the rest of his adventurous life in trees.

Family tree 
Cosimo is the son of Arminio Piovasco, who has strong intentions to rule the region on the Ligurian Coast in the eighteenth-century when the regions of Italy haven't united yet.
Grandparent: Head General of the War of Succession (father of Corradina)
Parents: Arminio Piovasco (father) and Corradina Von Kurtewitz (mother)
Children: Battista (elder sister), Cosimo, Biagio (younger brother)

Viola 
Cosimo leaps across the wall to the opposite tree and slowly decides to find a young girl, playing on a see-saw by herself, below. Cosimo discovers her name is Viola, and she claims her name is short for Violante.

Child characters in literature
Characters in Italian novels